Pachymerola ruficollis is a species of beetle in the family Cerambycidae. It was described by Giesbert in 1987.

References

Hyboderini
Beetles described in 1987